Granville Island Water Taxi Services was a privately owned and operated water taxi service in the Lower Mainland, British Columbia, Canada, which was replaced by English Bay Launch in the Fall of 2009. It was one of three water taxi services connecting Bowen Island to Vancouver with regularly scheduled service.  It also offered on demand charter services around the greater Vancouver area.

It operated enclosed vessels that could transport up to twelve passengers.  Passengers were allowed to bring bicycles on board.

Stops
Regularly scheduled routes operated between stops at the following locations:
Granville Island
Coal Harbour
Snug Cove

See also
 Aquabus - operates passenger ferries from Granville Island
 False Creek Ferries - operates passenger ferries from Granville Island

References

External links
Granville Island Water Taxi Services

Transport in Greater Vancouver
Tourism in Vancouver
Ferries of British Columbia
Water taxis
2009 disestablishments in British Columbia